The  mixed individual BC3 boccia event at the 2016 Summer Paralympics was contested from 13 September to 16 September at Sambodromo in Rio de Janeiro. 24 competitors took part.

The event structure was amended from the 2012 event, with pool stages added. The top players from each of eight round robin pools of three entered into a quarter final single elimination stage, with the losing semifinalists playing off for bronze.

Elimination rounds

Pool stages

Pool A

Pool B

Pool C

Pool D

Pool E

Pool F 

Pool G

Pool H

References

Individual BC3